Come On Up to the House: Women Sing Waits is a tribute album of Tom Waits songs performed by established female singers. The album was released in late 2019 by Dualtone Records, a couple weeks in advance of Waits' 70th birthday. Among the individual artists and groups featured are Rosanne Cash, Iris DeMent, Patty Griffin, Joseph (group), Shelby Lynne & Allison Moorer, Aimee Mann and The Wild Reeds.

The project was initiated by Dualtone president Scott Robinson, who invited author and musician Warren Zanes to serve as producer. Zanes personally contacted most of the artists, offering them the opportunity to select the songs they would like to record. None of the album's 12 tracks was previously released.

Track listing

Notes

2019 compilation albums
Tom Waits
Tom Waits tribute albums